In statistics, economics, and econophysics, the king effect is the phenomenon in which the top one or two members of a ranked set show up as clear outliers.  These top one or two members are unexpectedly large because they do not conform to the statistical distribution or rank-distribution which the remainder of the set obeys.

Distributions typically followed include the power-law distribution, that is a basis for the stretched exponential function, and parabolic fractal distribution.
The King effect has been observed in the distribution of:
 French city sizes (where the point representing Paris is the "king", failing to conform to the stretched exponential), and similarly for other countries with a primate city, such as the United Kingdom (London), and the extreme case of Bangkok (see list of cities in Thailand).
 Country populations (where only the points representing China and India fail to fit a stretched exponential).

Note, however, that the king effect is not limited to outliers with a positive evaluation attached to their rank: for rankings on an undesirable attribute, there may exist a pauper effect, with a similar detachment of extremely ranked data points from the reasonably distributed portion of the data set.

See also
 Zipf's law
 Didier Sornette
 pauper effect

References

Statistical data sets
Economics effects